The following teams participated in the Division II tournament. Group A played in Tallinn, Estonia. Group B played in Miercurea-Ciuc, Romania between December 13 and December 19, 2010.

Group A

All times local (EET/UTC+2)

Group B

All times local (EET/UTC+2)

Statistics

Top 10 scorers

Goaltending leaders 
(minimum 40% team's total ice time)

References

External links 
 IIHF.com

World Junior Ice Hockey Championships - Division Ii, 2011
II
World Junior Ice Hockey Championships – Division II
International ice hockey competitions hosted by Estonia
International ice hockey competitions hosted by Romania
2010–11 in Estonian ice hockey
Rom